In the Appalachian Mountains of the eastern United States, balds are mountain summits or crests covered primarily by thick vegetation of native grasses or shrubs occurring in areas where heavy forest growth would be expected.

Balds are found primarily in the Southern Appalachians, where, even at the highest elevations, the climate is too warm to support an alpine zone, areas where trees fail to grow due to short or non-existent growing seasons.  The difference between an alpine summit, such as Mount Washington in New Hampshire, and a bald, such as Gregory Bald in the Great Smoky Mountains, is that a lack of trees is normal for the colder climate of the former but abnormal for the warmer climate of the latter. One example of  southern balds' abnormality can be found at Roan Mountain, where Roan High Knob (el. 6,285 ft/1,915 m) is coated with a dense stand of spruce-fir forest, whereas an adjacent summit, Round Bald (el. 5,826 ft/1,776 m), is almost entirely devoid of trees. Why some summits are bald and some are not is a mystery, though there are several hypotheses.

Types

Two types of balds are found in the Appalachians:

Grassy balds
Grassy balds are relatively blunt summits covered by a dense sward of native grasses. Two types have been identified: those completely covered by grasses and those with a scattered overstory of mixed hardwoods with a grassy herbaceous layer. Grassy balds are normally found at the summit of hills, but can also be found on broad upper slopes.

Species found here include mountain oat-grass (Danthonia compressa), sedges (Carex brunnescens ssp. sphaerostachya, Carex debilis  var. rudgei, Carex pensylvanica), and forbs such as three-toothed cinquefoil (Sibbaldiopsis tridentata) and Blue Ridge St. Johns-wort (Hypericum mitchellianum).

Heath balds
Heath balds are typically found along narrow ridges and mountain crests, and consist of dense evergreen shrubs.  While the formation of grassy balds is a mystery, heath balds are often located in areas where the soil experiences heavy drainage or is highly acidic, which would complicate the growth of large wooded plants.

Four general types of vegetation are found on heath balds:
 Evergreen shrublands of Catawba rhododendron (Rhododendron catawbiense)
 Mixed shrublands of Catawba rhododendron, mountain-laurel (Kalmia latifolia), and black huckleberry (Gaylussacia baccata)
 Deciduous shrublands of American mountain-ash (Sorbus americana), minniebush (Menziesia pilosa), and southern mountain-cranberry (Vaccinium erythrocarpum)
 Deciduous shrubland of smooth blackberry (Rubus canadensis)

Origin and dynamics

The character and distribution of Appalachian balds remained stable from the time the first naturalists explored the region, until forestry regulations no longer permitted annual pasturing of local cattle. How and why a summit develops into a grassy bald is unknown; they represent "an ecological enigma and a conservation dilemma".  Weigl and Knowles note that "the presence of both rare, endemic plants and northern relicts requiring open habitat suggests a long evolutionary history" and offer a scenario in which grazing pressure of the giant herbivores of the Pleistocene retained the open tundra habitat as the Wisconsin glaciation retreated far to the north. With the arrival of the paleoindians and the disappearance of the megaherbivores, grazing pressure was maintained by deer and elk, and then by the grazing animals of European settlers. Some recent studies have attempted to uncover the vegetation history of some balds through analysis of the soil's organic component, since grasses leave a characteristic carbon-13 fingerprint.  While there is some evidence that grassy balds have natural origins, the forest quickly started to reclaim the balds once large-scale livestock grazing was eliminated by the creation of national parks and national forests.  Grassy balds such as Gregory Bald and Andrews Bald in the Great Smokies and the balds in the Roan Highlands are currently maintained as bald areas by the National Park Service and U.S. Forest Service.

The mountaintop meadows called the Southern Balds form a distinctive stretch for hikers of the Appalachian Trail.

List of major Appalachian Balds

See also
Appalachian bogs
Cove (Appalachian Mountains)
Southern Appalachian spruce-fir forest
Sods

References

External links
Roan Mountain Highlands
TNlandforms.us: Tennessee balds — GPS data and maps.

 

Appalachian Mountains
Natural history of the Great Smoky Mountains
Plant communities of North Carolina
Plant communities of Tennessee
Plant communities of Virginia
Plant communities of Georgia (U.S. state)
Community ecology
Ecology of the Appalachian Mountains
.
.
.
.